The Piaxtla River is a short coastal river of the northwest area of Mexico that flows into the Pacific Ocean, it has a length of 220 km and drains a basin of 11,473 km².

See also
List of rivers of Mexico
List of rivers of the Americas by coastline

References

Atlas of Mexico, 1975.
The Prentice Hall American World Atlas, 1984.
Rand McNally, The New International Atlas, 1993.

Rivers of Mexico